Omorgus wittei is a species of hide beetle in the subfamily Omorginae and subgenus Afromorgus.

References

wittei
Beetles described in 1955